Muddy Creek is a  tributary of the Conestoga River in Lancaster County, Pennsylvania, in the United States.

The tributary Little Muddy Creek joins Muddy Creek  from the Conestoga River.

Muddy Creek was formerly spanned by the Red Run Covered Bridge.

See also
List of rivers of Pennsylvania

References

Rivers of Pennsylvania
Tributaries of the Conestoga River
Rivers of Lancaster County, Pennsylvania